Alsodes verrucosus (common name: olive spiny-chest frog) is a species of frog in the family Alsodidae.
It is found in the Andes of Chile (Cautín and Puyehue) and Neuquén and Río Negro Provinces, Argentina. These frogs inhabit temperate Nothofagus forest where they occur under logs and near damp areas. Tadpoles develop in cold, deep streams.
It is threatened by habitat loss caused by logging.

References

verrucosus
Amphibians of Argentina
Amphibians of Chile
Taxonomy articles created by Polbot
Amphibians described in 1902